Karina Kork (born 23 February 1995) is an Estonian footballer who plays as a goalkeeper for IFK Kalmar and the Estonia women's national team.

Career
Kork has been a member of the Estonia national team since 2019. After making 188 appearances for Estonian club Tallinna Kalev, she signed for Finnish club HJK. In her debut season for HJK, she was largely a backup for their main goalkeeper Anna Koivunen.

References

1995 births
Living people
Women's association football goalkeepers
Estonian women's footballers
Estonia women's international footballers
JK Tallinna Kalev (women) players
Helsingin Jalkapalloklubi (women) players
Footballers from Tallinn
Estonian expatriate footballers
Estonian expatriate sportspeople in Finland
Expatriate footballers in Finland
Estonian expatriate sportspeople in Austria
Expatriate footballers in Austria
Estonian expatriate sportspeople in Sweden
Expatriate footballers in Sweden